Jennifer Meier (born 13 April 1981) is a German former footballer who played as a striker. She was capped seven times for the Germany national team.

Meier started her career in VfR Bürstadt. She played for 1. FFC Frankfurt, Washington Freedom, and FSV Frankfurt. After that, Meier played in Sweden for QBIK Karlstad.  In 2008, she joined Djurgårdens IF and made 39 Damallsvenskan appearances (three goals) in the 2008 and 2009 seasons. After a spell with Bollstanäs SK she retired from football in 2012 and settled in Sweden.

References

1981 births
Living people
People from Worms, Germany
German women's footballers
Footballers from Rhineland-Palatinate
Women's association football forwards
Germany women's international footballers
Washington Freedom players
Damallsvenskan players
QBIK players
Djurgårdens IF Fotboll (women) players
1. FFC Frankfurt players
Women's United Soccer Association players
German expatriate women's footballers
German expatriate sportspeople in the United States
Expatriate women's soccer players in the United States
German expatriate sportspeople in Sweden
Expatriate women's footballers in Sweden